Agata Guściora (born 6 October 1994) is a Polish footballer who plays as a defender and has appeared for the Poland women's national team.

Career
Guściora has been capped for the Poland national team, appearing for the team during the 2019 FIFA Women's World Cup qualifying cycle.

International goals

References

External links
 
 
 

1994 births
Living people
Polish women's footballers
Poland women's international footballers
Women's association football defenders